Dąbrówka Mała ("little Dąbrówka") is a district of Katowice in southern Poland.

Dąbrówka Mała may also refer to the following villages:
Dąbrówka Mała, Łódź Voivodeship (central Poland)
Dąbrówka Mała, Lubusz Voivodeship (west Poland)
Dąbrówka Mała, Olsztyn County in Warmian-Masurian Voivodeship (north Poland)
Dąbrówka Mała, Węgorzewo County in Warmian-Masurian Voivodeship (north Poland)